Robert Fitzmaurice Deane, 9th Baron Muskerry (born 26 March 1948), is a nobleman in the Peerage of Ireland.

Born in Grahamstown, South Africa, he is married to Rita, Lady Muskerry, and is resident in Durban, South Africa. The couple has three children:
Hon. Nicola Deane (born 1976)
Hon. Catherine Deane (born 1978), a fashion designer
Hon. Johnathan Fitzmaurice Deane (born 1986)

He was educated at Sandford Park, Dublin, Ireland, and then Trinity College, Dublin.

The Deane family home is Springfield Castle, Drumcollogher, County Limerick, Ireland, which has been in the family for many generations. The Deane family motto is "Forti et fideli nihil difficile" meaning "To the brave and faithful nothing is impossible."

External links
Springfield Castle

Alumni of Trinity College Dublin
Barons in the Peerage of Ireland
1948 births
Living people